Crosthwaite is a small village located in the Parish of Crosthwaite and Lyth, South Lakeland, Cumbria, England. It is in the Lake District National Park.

Village hall
The Argles Memorial Hall was built in 1931 on land donated from the local landowners. It underwent a major refurbishment in 2003 and is currently used by The Exchange, children's playgroups and keep fit classes.

Exchange

The Crosthwaite Exchange was set up in February 2007 as a place for local people to buy and sell local produce, home baked goods, books, and meet up with other villagers. Since then, the exchange has been used by the NHS as a model for exchanges in other villages.

St Mary's Parish Church
Crosthwaite is home to the St Mary's Parish Church. The first reference to a place of worship was in a 12th-century grant of land.

See also

Listed buildings in Crosthwaite and Lyth

References

External links

 Crosthwaite and Lyth website

Location Grid

Westmorland
Villages in Cumbria
South Lakeland District